Preferred may refer to:
Chase Sapphire Preferred, a credit card
Preferred frame, in physics, a special hypothetical frame of reference
Preferred number, standard guidelines for choosing exact product dimensions within a given set of constraints
Preferred stock, a class of stock

See also
Preference